Oyster Bay is an unincorporated community in Baldwin County, Alabama, United States. The Nicholson House, which is listed on the National Register of Historic Places, is located in Oyster Bay.

References

Unincorporated communities in Baldwin County, Alabama
Unincorporated communities in Alabama